{|

{{Infobox ship career
|Hide header         =
|Ship country=United Kingdom
|Ship flag           = 
|Ship name           = HM Trawler Agate|Ship owner          = Originally built for Boston Deep Sea Fishing and Ice Company Ltd
|Ship operator       = Royal Navy
|Ship registry       =
|Ship route          =
|Ship ordered        =
|Ship builder        = Smiths Dock, South Bank-on-Tees, Middlesbrough
|Ship original cost  =
|Ship yard number    =
|Ship way number     =
|Ship laid down      = 1932
|Ship launched       = 18 December 1933
|Ship completed      =
|Ship christened     =
|Ship acquired       = By the Royal Navy in 1935
|Ship maiden voyage  =
|Ship in service     =
|Ship out of service =
|Ship fate           = Became stranded becoming a total Wreck on Haisborough Sands off the Norfolk coast, England
|Ship notes          =Mercantile Type (First Group) Anti Submarine.
}}

|}
HM Trawler Agate was purchased by the Royal Navy in 1935. She was modified from a trawler to be used to carry out anti-submarine work. In 1941 she was with the maintenance reserve at Rosyth, but in August was part of the Royal Navy's escort flotilla with convoy FS559 when she ran aground, becoming a total loss, on Haisborough Sands on 6 August with a loss of sixteen crewmen.

HistoryHM Trawler Agate was built in 1934 at Smiths Dock in Middlesbrough, England. She had been ordered by the Boston Deep Sea Fishing and Ice Company (B. A. Parkes) of Fleetwood, Lancashire. The trawler was originally called Mavis Rose.

Final voyage
On 5 August Convoy FS 559 was proceeding down the East coast of Britain to London from Newcastle. The convoy was being escorted by two Royal Navy destroyers of the Rosyth escort-force.  was an old V-class destroyer built in 1917, whilst HMS Wolsey was a Thorneycroft W-class built a year later in 1918. Also helping with the escort duties were HM Trawler Agate and HM Trawler Arkwright. The night was drawing in as the convoy made its way down the coast and the weather was poor. There was a north-north-west gale in full blow with rain. It was cold and visibility was poor. By the early hours and daylight of 6 August, the convoy was enveloped in a thick sea mist, making visibility very poor. There are two accounts of what happened to HM Agate, but the most likely cause of event are as follows.

Run aground
The convoy had been unable to see the Haisborough light vessel due to the bad visibility, and in any case, due to wartime restrictions, the light was only illuminated for ten minutes when a convoy was due in the area. It is thought that due to the combination of the bad weather conditions, the strong westerly drift, and the fact that the exact position of the convoy was unavailable, HM Agate led seven of the convoy's ships onto the sands, where they ran aground. A further report from SS Oxshott describes HM Agate bearing down on her. The Oxshott was the first of the seven to run aground. The other vessels were the SS Afon Towy, SS Deerwood, SS Betty Hindley, SS Aberhill,  and the SS Taara. Although the lifeboats from Cromer and Great Yarmouth and Gorleston rescued 137 men from the wrecked ships, 37 men perished, including 16 men from HM Trawler Agate. All three officers of Agate were lost; eight men survived, five of them picked up from a Carley raft by HM Trawler Basset''.

Position of the wreck of HM Trawler Agate today

 North of Hemsby East-north east of North Walsham North of Caister on Sea  East of Cromer

Footnotes

References

Shipwrecks of Norfolk
Steamships
Shipwrecks in the North Sea
Maritime incidents in August 1941
World War II naval ships of the United Kingdom
World War II merchant ships of the United Kingdom
Naval trawlers of the United Kingdom
Anti-submarine trawlers of the Royal Navy
1933 ships
Ice trade